The 2012–13 season of the División de Honor de Waterpolo is the 90th season of top-tier water polo in Spain since its inception in 1925.

The season comprises regular season and championship playoff. Regular season started in October 2012 and will finish on April 13, 2013. Top eight team at standings play championship playoff.

Championship playoff will begin a week later with semifinals, playing the final around late May.

Atlètic-Barceloneta was the defending champions and will remain so for next season (2013–14) after defeating Sabadell 3–1 in the Championship Final.

Teams

Regular season standings

Source:

Championship playoffs

Quarter-finals

1st leg

2nd leg

Atlètic-Barceloneta won series 2–0 and advanced to Semifinals.

Real Canoe-Isostar won series 2–0 and advanced to Semifinals.

Sabadell won series 2–0 and advanced to Semifinals.

3rd leg

Mediterrani won series 2–1 and advanced to Semifinals.

Semifinals

1st leg

2nd leg

Atlètic-Barceloneta won series 2–0 and advanced to Final.

Sabadell won series 2–0 and advanced to Final.

Final

1st leg

2nd leg

3rd leg

4th leg

Atlètic-Barceloneta won Championship final series 3–1.

Individual awards
 Championship MVP:  Felipe Perrone, CN Atlètic-Barceloneta
 Best Goalkeeper:  Iñaki Aguilar, CN Sabadell
 Top goalscorer:  Joel Esteller, CN Barcelona

Relegation playoff
Playoff to be played in two legs. First leg to be played on 4 May and 2nd leg on 11 May. The overall winner will play in División de Honor 2013–14 and the loser one in Primera Nacional.

|}

1st leg

2nd leg

Helios won series 2–0 and remained in División de Honor.

Top goal scorers

(regular season only)

See also
 2012–13 División de Honor Femenina de Waterpolo

References

External links
 Real Federación Española de Natación
 Competition format
 Relegation playoff rules

División de Honor de Waterpolo
Seasons in Spanish water polo competitions
Spain
2012 in water polo
2013 in water polo
2012 in Spanish sport
2013 in Spanish sport